JTL-E .500 S&W Magnum 12" is a German 5-shot double-action revolver chambered for the .500 S&W Magnum cartridge, developed by Janz-Präzisionstechnik GmbH.

The revolver has a 12-inch (30 cm) barrel with no muzzle brake or ports.  It is able to fire even the heaviest .500 S&W Magnum bullets weighing 725 grains.  It has a clockwise cylinder rotation with a tight barrel-cylinder gap of less than 0.10 mm.  The interior and exterior are made of a hardened stainless steel.  The cylinder steel contains a high percentage of chrome.  The frame is made of a chrome-manganese steel.  The cold hammer forged barrel is made of a chrome-molybdenum-manganese steel.  The revolver comes with a Nill grips, screwed together and magnetically secured with gold plated discs.  It has a highly polished finish, a titanium nitride coating and a gold plating on the hammer and the trigger.

External links
 Janz Revolver
 Janz Revolver USA

Revolvers
12.7 mm firearms
.50 caliber handguns